Malyshkin (from малышка meaning baby, little thing) is a Russian masculine surname, its feminine counterpart is Malyshkina. It may refer to
Oleg Malyshkin (born 1951), Russian politician
263940 Malyshkina, a minor planet

References 

Russian-language surnames